The Sagar Rajput is a Hindu caste.

History and origin
The Sagar Rajput caste was formerly known as Shegar Dhangar. They were shepherds and farmers by tradition. They owned more farming land than other farming communities and also held the office of the Patil prior to independence. The living informants at the time of study of this caste by scholars asserted that they changed their name to Sagar Rajput after holding a caste meeting and one of these Rajputs claimed to have gone to a Pandit in Pune who had uncovered their lineage. This lineage connected them with the Maratha ruler Malhar Rao Holkar, who was a Dhangar Shepherd and back to the Rajput Rulers of Rajasthan.

Robert Eric Frykenberg states that they were originally from the Shudra varna and successfully changed their status to twice-born by employing genealogists due to improvement in economic conditions and thus changed their name to Sagar Rajputs and started wearing the Sacred thread.

See also
Rajputization

References

Rajput clans of Gujarat

Dhangar